Maximiliano "Max" Roldán Cejas (born 7 February 1980 -La Plata- ) is an Argentine footballer who plays for ASD Ferentillo-Valnerina.

Biography
Cejas started his career at hometown club Estudiantes de La Plata. After played 7 matches for Estudiantes, he left for Primera B Nacional side Defensa y Justicia.

In summer 2002, he left for Italy for Milazzo at Serie D. Players without EU nationality could only signed by Serie A or Serie B that season or played at non-professional level.

In the next season, he joined Serie C2 side Giugliano. His EU passport was solved after the start of season and made his league debut in January 2004. He was the regular starter for Giugliano.

In summer 2006, he left for Serie C1 side Taranto, where he played between regular starter and substitute player.

In 2008, he joined Benevento of Lega Pro Prima Divisione on free transfer.

On 5 December 2018, Cejas joined ASD Ferentillo-Valnerina.

International career
Cejas capped for Argentina U17 at 1997 FIFA U-17 World Championship.

References

External links
 Profile at AIC.Football.it 
 
 Maximiliano Cejas at BDFA.com.ar 
 Profile at argentinesoccer.com
 

1980 births
Living people
Argentine footballers
Argentina youth international footballers
Argentine expatriate footballers
Estudiantes de La Plata footballers
Defensa y Justicia footballers
S.S.C. Giugliano players
Taranto F.C. 1927 players
Benevento Calcio players
Ternana Calcio players
Latina Calcio 1932 players
Forlì F.C. players
S.P. La Fiorita players
Serie B players
Serie C players
Serie D players
Association football midfielders
Footballers from La Plata
Argentine expatriate sportspeople in Italy
Argentine expatriate sportspeople in San Marino
Expatriate footballers in Italy
Expatriate footballers in San Marino